A Fuck Up is a 2012 Norwegian comedy film directed by Øystein Karlsen.

Cast 
 Jon Øigarden as Jack
 Tuva Novotny as Robin
 Anders Baasmo Christiansen as Rasmussen
 Atle Antonsen as Glen
 Lennart Jähkel as Leopold
 Rebecka Hemse as Rebecca
 Iben Hjejle as Malin

References

External links 

2012 comedy films
2012 films
Norwegian comedy films
2010s Norwegian-language films